Gwendolen Florence Mary Guinness, Countess of Iveagh (née Onslow; 22 July 1881 – 16 February 1966) was an Anglo-Irish aristocrat and Conservative politician. She was, by marriage, a member of the Guinness brewing dynasty.

Early life 
She was the daughter of William Hillier Onslow, 4th Earl of Onslow (1853–1911), and Florence Coulston Onslow, née Gardner (1853–1934).

Marriage and career 
She was married to the Conservative Member of Parliament (MP) for Southend, Rupert Guinness, 2nd Earl of Iveagh.  In 1927, he ceased to be an MP when he succeeded to his father's earldom.  The Countess of Iveagh, as Gwendolen Guinness was now known, won the Southend by-election on 19 November 1927 to replace her husband as MP. She received 54.6% of the vote at that election and increased it at the 1931 general election. She served until her retirement at the 1935 general election.

When she retired in 1935, she was succeeded as MP by Henry "Chips" Channon, the husband of her eldest daughter, Honor Guinness. Another son-in-law, Alan Lennox-Boyd, was an MP (for Mid Bedfordshire 1931–60, and thus became, with Gwendolen, the first mother- and son-in-law pair of MPs.

Clandon Park House 
In 1956 she presented her Surrey childhood home, Clandon Park House, to the National Trust.

Titles 
1881 – 1903: The Lady Gwendolen Florence Mary Onslow
1903 – 1919: The Lady Gwendolyn Guinness
1919 – 1927: Viscountess Elveden
1927 – 1966: The Right Honourable The Countess of Iveagh

References 

 Martin Pugh, "Guinness , Gwendolen Florence Mary, countess of Iveagh (1881–1966)", Oxford Dictionary of National Biography, Oxford University Press, 2004 accessed 27 May 2007

External links 
 
 

1881 births
1966 deaths
Conservative Party (UK) MPs for English constituencies
Female members of the Parliament of the United Kingdom for English constituencies
British countesses
Daughters of British earls
Gwendolen Guinness, Countess of Iveagh
UK MPs 1924–1929
UK MPs 1929–1931
UK MPs 1931–1935
20th-century British women politicians
20th-century English women
20th-century English people